The Shrine of Husayn's Head was a Fatimid-era shrine reputed to have held the head of Husayn ibn Ali between c.906 CE and 1153 CE. It was located on a hill outside the Palestinian town of Al-Jura.

The shrine was destroyed by the Israeli army in 1950, more than a year after hostilities ended, on the orders of Moshe Dayan. It is thought that the demolition was related to Dayan's efforts to expel the remaining Palestinian Arabs from the region.

It was considered the most important Shi'a shrine in Palestine.

Description

Building
The shrine was a large multi-story structure built up on three sides around a central courtyard. A prayer room (musalla) was on the south side. The former place of Husayn's head was marked by a pillar capped with a green turban over a red cloth.

Minbar and inscriptions

The minbar (an Islamic pulpit), today in the Ibrahimi Mosque in Hebron, is considered a significant piece of Islamic art and one of the most significant historic minbars in the medieval Muslim world. It is also the oldest surviving minbar in this style of woodwork with geometric decoration; a style also seen in the design of the later Minbar of the al-Aqsa Mosque in Jerusalem (which was also a gift from Salah ad-Din). The inscriptions record the construction of the minbar and of the shrine itself by Badr al-Jamali on behalf of the Fatimid caliph.

History

Construction

According to Fatimid tradition, the head of Husayn had been secretly moved by the Abbasids from its original burial site at the Great Mosque of Damascus. In the year 985, the 15th Fatimid Caliph, Abu Mansoor Nizar al-Aziz Billah, traced the site of his great-grandfather's head through the office of a contemporary in Baghdad. 

It was "rediscovered" in 1091, a couple of years after a campaign by grand vizier Badr al-Jamali to reestablish Fatimid control over Palestine under Caliph al-Mustansir Billah.

Upon the discovery, he ordered the construction of a new Friday mosque and mashhad (memorial shrine) on the site. A magnificent minbar was also built, today in Hebron and known as the Minbar of the Ibrahimi Mosque.

The mausoleum was described by Mohammed al-Abdari al-Hihi as the most magnificent building in Ashkelon.

Transfer of the head to Cairo

Following the defeat at the Siege of Ascalon, the Majidi-monarch, Al-Zafir, ordered Ashkelon's ruler Sayf al-Mamlaka Tamim to transfer the head to Cairo. 

Husayn's casket was unearthed and moved from the shrine to Cairo on Sunday 8 Jumada al-Thani, 548 (31 August 1153); the Al-Hussein Mosque was built to house the relic in 1154. Yemeni writer Syedi Hasan bin Asad described the transfer of the head thus in his Risalah manuscript: "When the Raas [head of] al Imam al Husain was taken out of the casket, in Ashkelon, drops of the fresh blood were visible on the Raas al Imam al Husain and the fragrance of Musk spread all over."

Transfer of the minbar to Hebron

In 1187 Salah ad-Din (Saladin) succeeded in recapturing Jerusalem from Crusaders and securing Muslim (Ayyubid) control over most of the region. However, he judged that Ashkelon was too vulnerable to a Crusader counterattack and he worried about its potential use as an enemy bridgehead against the newly recaptured Jerusalem. He therefore decided to demolish the city in 1191 but transferred the Fatimid minbar of al-Husayn's now-empty mashhad to the Ibrahimi Mosque in Hebron, which was also a holy site and was situated at a safer distance from the Crusader threat. The minbar has remained there until the present day.

British Mandate period
During the British Mandate period it was described as a "large maqam on top of a hill" with no tomb but a fragment of a pillar showing the place where the head had been buried.

Destruction in 1950
In July 1950, the shrine was destroyed at the instructions of Moshe Dayan in accordance with a 1950s Israeli policy of erasing Muslim historical sites within Israel in order to assist the eviction of remaining Palestinians.

Reestablishment in 2000

The area was razed and subsequently redeveloped for a local Israeli hospital, Barzilai.

After the site was re-identified on the hospital grounds, funds from Mohammed Burhanuddin, the 52nd Da'i al-Mutlaq of the Dawoodi Bohras, a Shi'a Ismaili sect of predominantly Gujarati descent based in India, were used to construct a marble prayer platform. 

Dawoodi Bohra pilgrims from India and Pakistan continue to visit Ashkelon despite resulting complications in travelling to other Muslim nations.

Historically the shrine was also a site of pilgrimage for Palestinian Sunnis.

References

Bibliography

See also
Al Husayn Shrine
Al Hussein Mosque
The Great Mosque of Damascus

Mausoleums in Israel
Ashkelon
Demolished religious buildings and structures
Israeli–Palestinian conflict
Shia shrines
Buildings and structures demolished in 1950
Husayn ibn Ali